Crognale is a surname. Notable people with the surname include:

Alex Crognale (born 1994), American soccer player
Eli Crognale (born 1997), American soccer player
Giuliano Crognale (1770–1862), Italian poet and painter
Sabrina Crognale (born 1985), Italian modern pentathlete